Dave Attell's Insomniac Tour was a comedy tour featuring Dave Attell along with his friends and fellow stand-up comedians Greg Giraldo, Sean Rouse and Dane Cook which took place in Las Vegas, Nevada.

At every performance of the Insomniac tour, Attell featured a toast to friend and former tourmate, Mitch Hedberg, who died on March 29, 2005.

Critical reception
Maxim wrote "Yet Attell still steals the show. Offensive in all the right places, and tubby everywhere else, his theory on why a penguin can never be a waiter deserves to be scientific law. Separately, they are impressive, but combining like a comedy Voltron, the quartet could be the most impressive force in stand-up—with Attell forming the very bald lion head."

References

External links

Comedy tours